North Carolina's 93rd House district is one of 120 districts in the North Carolina House of Representatives. It has been represented by Republican Ray Pickett since 2021.

Geography
Since 2023, the district has included all of Alleghany and Ashe counties, as well as part of Watauga County. The district overlaps with the 47th Senate district.

District officeholders

Election results

2022

2020

2018

2016

2014

2012

2010

2008

2006

2004

2002

2000

References

North Carolina House districts
Alleghany County, North Carolina
Ashe County, North Carolina
Watauga County, North Carolina